Wang Xinxin (born April 2, 1998) is a Chinese female beach volleyball player. She is a competitor at the 2020 Summer Olympics with partner Xue Chen.

References

External links
 Wang Xinxin Beach Volleyball Player Profile

1998 births
Living people
Chinese female beach volleyball players
Olympic beach volleyball players of China
Sportspeople from Shandong
Volleyball players from Shandong
Beach volleyball players at the 2020 Summer Olympics
Beach volleyball players at the 2018 Asian Games
21st-century Chinese women